Sugar Town is a 1999 independent film co-written and co-directed by Allison Anders and Kurt Voss, concerning a tangled web of characters coping with ambition, fame, and the aftermath of fame.  The film was named after the 1966 hit single "Sugar Town" by Nancy Sinatra.

Anders was eager to make another film about the music industry after her earlier films Border Radio and Grace of My Heart.  After her friend John Taylor had left Duran Duran and was beginning to launch an acting career, she and Voss wrote the film fairly quickly, and cast several musical friends of hers in the convoluted plot.

The film premiered at the Sundance Film Festival on January 26, 1999, where it received a distribution deal with October Films and USA Films.  Sugar Town was then shown in limited release in the United States in September of that year, before appearing at several overseas film festivals.

Plot summary
Clive, Jonesey and Nick form an aging supergroup built of refugees from other bands.  They and their producer Burt seek backing from Jane, a rich investor who will only help if the lead singer will sleep with her.

Liz is a neurotic film production designer who has just hired a conniving young housekeeper and would-be singer named Gwen.  Liz searches hopelessly for a decent man while Gwen commits acts of shameless cruelty in the service of her ambition.

Best friend to Liz is Clive's wife Eva, an older actress who is struggling to get good roles.  Clive and Eva's life is thrown into upheaval when a cult member shows up on their doorstep to drop off a surly 12-year-old "love child" that she claims Clive fathered.

A subplot involves guitarist Carl, who is hired to travel away from his pregnant wife by a singer with ulterior motives, just as his junkie brother emerges from rehab and comes to stay with the family.

Cast

Main cast

Supporting cast

Production
This movie was written and filmed in less than six months, so quickly that Lucinda Jenney's actual pregnancy, which Allison Anders and Kurt Voss had written into their script, was still ongoing when she played the part. The filmmakers may have found such spontaneity liberating, but it harmed their project as much as helped it.

Reception
Sugar Town received generally mixed reviews from critics. Review aggregator Rotten Tomatoes gives the film an approval rating of 67%, based on 24 reviews, with an average rating of 6.18/10. In Roger Ebert's review, he states, "The movie is not profound or tightly plotted or a 'statement,' nor should it be. It captures day-to-day drifting in a city without seasons, where most business meetings are so circular and unfocused it's hard to notice when they stop resulting in deals and simply exist for their own sake."

References

External links
 The Sundance Channel: Sugar Town
 Salon.com review
 Flixster listing
 
 

American independent films
1999 films
1999 comedy films
Films directed by Allison Anders
American comedy films
1999 independent films
1990s English-language films
1990s American films